Willie Beamon (born June 14, 1970) is a former professional American football cornerback in the National Football League. After not being drafted, he played four seasons for the New York Giants after playing for the  University of Northern Iowa in the early 1990s. Beamon is not to be confused with the fictional character Willie Beamen, played by Jamie Foxx in the 1999 film, Any Given Sunday.

1970 births
Living people
People from Belle Glade, Florida
Players of American football from Florida
American football cornerbacks
Northern Iowa Panthers football players
New York Giants players